The 11th Cavalry (Frontier Force), is an armoured regiment of the Pakistan Army. It was previously known as the 11th Prince Albert Victor's Own Cavalry and was a regular cavalry regiment of the old British Indian Army. It was formed in 1921 by the amalgamation of the 21st Prince Albert Victor's Own Cavalry (Frontier Force) and the 23rd Cavalry.

21st Prince Albert Victor's Own Cavalry (Frontier Force) (Daly's Horse)
The 21st Prince Albert Victor's Own Cavalry (Frontier Force) (Daly's Horse) was raised as the 1st Punjab Irregular Cavalry by Lieutenant Henry Daly at Peshawar on 18 May 1849. It was one of five regiments of Punjab Cavalry raised to guard the North West Frontier of India, which soon became famous as part of the legendary Punjab Frontier Force or the Piffers. Over the next decades, the regiment saw extensive service on the Frontier. During the Indian Mutiny of 1857–58, the regiment operated in North India and took part in the Siege of Delhi and the Relief of Lucknow, where Lieutenant John Watson won the Victoria Cross. During the Second Afghan War of 1878–80, it formed part of Kandahar Field Force and fought in the Battle of Ahmed Khel. In 1890, Prince Albert Victor, the Crown Prince of Britain was gazetted as their Colonel-in-Chief, giving his name to the regiment, which has endured to this day. During the First World War, the regiment served in the Mesopotamian Campaign as part of 6th Indian Cavalry Brigade. It fought on the Tigris Front and took part in the capture of Kut al Amara and Baghdad. It also fought in the Actions of Istabulat, Ramadi, Daur and Tikrit. Later it saw service in Kurdistan and took part in the capture of Kirkuk.
 1849   1st Punjab Irregular Cavalry
 1851   1st Regiment of Cavalry, Punjab Irregular Force
 1865   1st Regiment of Cavalry, Punjab Frontier Force
 1890   1st (Prince Albert Victor's Own) Regiment of Cavalry, Punjab Frontier Force
 1901   1st (Prince Albert Victor's Own) Punjab Cavalry
 1903   21st Prince Albert Victor's Own Cavalry (Frontier Force)
 1904   21st Prince Albert Victor's Own Cavalry (Frontier Force) (Daly's Horse)

23rd Punjab Cavalry (Frontier Force)
The 23rd Cavalry was raised as the 3rd Punjab Irregular Cavalry by Lieutenant WG Prendergast at Lahore in 1849, and it too saw extensive service on the Frontier with the Punjab Frontier Force. During the Second Afghan War, it was part of the  Kabul Field Force, and took part in Lord Roberts' famous march from Kabul to Kandahar and fought in the Battle of Kandahar. During the First World War, the regiment served in Mesopotamia as part of the 11th Indian Cavalry Brigade and was part of General Townsend's failed advance towards Baghdad. It then served on the Tigris Front. Later on, it moved to the Euphrates Front and fought in the Battles of Khan Baghdadi and Sharqat. One of its squadrons served in Persian Arabistan. On their return to Indian they saw service in the Third Afghan War of 1919.
 1849	3rd Punjab Irregular Cavalry
 1851	3rd Regiment of Cavalry, Punjab Irregular Force
 1865	3rd Regiment of Cavalry, Punjab	Frontier Force
 1901	3rd Punjab Cavalry
 1903	23rd Punjab Cavalry (Frontier Force)

Combined regiment
After the First World War, the number of Indian cavalry regiments was reduced from thirty-nine to twenty-one. However, instead of disbanding the surplus units, it was decided to amalgamate them in pairs. This resulted in renumbering and renaming of the entire cavalry line. The 21st and 23rd Cavalry were amalgamated in 1921 to form 11th Prince Albert Victor's Own Cavalry (Frontier Force).
The uniform of PAVO Cavalry was blue with scarlet facings. The new regiment's badge consisted of the Kandahar Star representing the five rivers of the Punjab. Its class composition was one squadron each of Punjabi Muslims, Sikhs and Dogras. The regiment was mechanised in 1940. During the Second World War, it initially served in Syria and Iran, and then went on to North Africa, where it fought in the Battle of Gazala. It then moved to Burma, where it greatly distinguished itself against the Japanese. In 1946, the regiment was sent to the Dutch East Indies (Indonesia) to pacify the country after the surrender of the Japanese.

On Partition of India in 1947, PAVO Cavalry was allotted to Pakistan. The regiment was soon engaged in fighting the Indians in Kashmir. In 1956, Pakistan became a republic and all titles pertaining to British royalty were dropped. The regiment's new designation was 11th Cavalry (Frontier Force). During the Indo-Pakistani War of 1965, 11th Cavalry took part in Pakistan Army's advance towards Akhnur in Kashmir. It then fought in the Battle of Chawinda. In 1971, the regiment again served in the Chhamb Sector of Kashmir. It is the only armoured regiment of Pakistan Army to carry Battle Honours on its Regimental Colours for all three wars fought with India.
 1921	21st/23rd Cavalry (amalgamation)
 1922	11th Prince Albert Victor's Own Cavalry (Frontier Force)
 1927	Prince Albert Victor's Own Cavalry (11th Frontier Force)
 1956	11th Cavalry (Frontier Force)

Badge
The badge worn by 11 Cavalry (Frontier Force) since 1974 is an amalgamation of badges of 21st Prince Albert Victor's Own Cavalry (Frontier Force) (Daly's Horse) and 23rd Punjab Cavalry (Frontier Force). It consists of the Kabul to Kandahar Star taken from the badge of 23rd Punjab Cavalry that participated in the Second Afghan War. The swords are taken from the badge of 21st PAVO Cavalry, however, Christian Swords were replaced by Muslim Swords. The Arabic Numerals "١١" replaced the English Numerals "11". Quranic Verse replaced "KABUL TO KANDHAR 1880" around the Numeral "١١". The bugle on top shows association of this regiment with PIFFERS.

Battle Honours
British India:

 Delhi 1857
 Lucknow 1857
 Afghanistan 1878–80
 Ahmad Khel 1880
 Kandahar 1880,
 Mesopotamia 1915–18
 Kut al Amara 1917
 Baghdad 1917
 Khan Baghdadi 1918
 Sharqat 1918
 Afghanistan 1919
 El Mechili 1941 (Libya)
 Halfaya 1941 (Egypt)
 Gazala 1941 (Egypt)
 Bir Hacheim 1942 (Egypt)
 Kohima 1944 (India)
 Monywa 1945 (Burma)
 Myinmu 1945 (Burma)
 Irrawaddy 1945 (Burma)
 Meiktilla 1945 (Burma)
 Mandalay 1945 (Burma)
 Rangoon 1945 (Burma)
 Malaya 1945
 Java 1946 (Malaya)

Pakistan:
 Kashmir 1948
 Chhamb 1965
 Chawinda 1965
 Chhamb 1971

Affiliations & Alliances
  The  9th Battalion of the Frontier Force Regiment
  1st The Queen's Dragoon Guards

References

Further reading
 Effendi, Col MY. (2007). Punjab Cavalry: Evolution, Role, Organisation, and Tactical Doctrine, 11 Cavalry (Frontier Force) 1849–1971. Karachi: Oxford University Press. 
 History of the 1st Punjab Cavalry. (1887). Lahore: Civil and Military Gazette Press.
 History of the 3rd Regiment Punjab Cavalry. (1887).
 History of the 23rd Cavalry (Frontier Force), late 3rd Regiment, Punjab Cavalry. (1910).
 Short History of the PAVO Cavalry (11th Frontier Force). (1936).
 Gaylor, J. (1991). Sons of John Company: The Indian and Pakistan Armies 1903–1991. Stroud: Spellmount. 
 Dey, RSBN. (1905). A Brief Account of the Late Punjab Frontier Force, From its Organization in 1849 to its Re-distribution on 31st March 1903. Calcutta.
 North, REFG. (1934). The Punjab Frontier Force: A Brief Record of Their Services 1846–1924. DI Khan: Commercial Steam Press.
 Hayauddin, Maj Gen M. (1950). One Hundred Glorious Years: A History of the Punjab Frontier Force, 1849–1949. Lahore: Civil and Military Gazette Press.
 Elliott, Maj Gen JG. (1968). The Frontier 1839–1947: The Story of the North-West Frontier of India. London: Cassell.
 Daly, Maj Hugh. (1905). Memoirs of General Sir Henry Dermot Daly, GCB, CIE. London: J Murray.
 Trench, CC. (1988). The Indian Army and the King's Enemies, 1900–1947. London: Thames and Hudson.
 Kempton, C. (1996). A Register of Titles of the Units of the H.E.I.C. & Indian Armies 1666–1947. Bristol: British Empire & Commonwealth Museum.

External links
General Sir Henry Dermot Daly

British Indian Army cavalry regiments
Honourable East India Company regiments
Armoured regiments of Pakistan
Indian World War I regiments
Indian World War II regiments
Military units and formations established in 1849
1921 establishments in British India
R
Indo-Pakistani War of 1947–1948